Lompar (Cyrillic: Ломпар) is a Montenegrin surname. Notable people with the surname include:

Andrija Lompar (born 1956), Montenegrin politician
Milo Lompar (born 1962), Serbian literary historian

Montenegrin surnames